The Brazil national under-16 and under-17 basketball team, is controlled by the Brazilian Basketball Confederation, abbreviated as CBB. and represents Brazil in international under-17 and under-16 (under age 17 and under age 16) basketball competitions. 

Its best result was 5th place at the 2015 FIBA Americas Under-16 Championship.

The team won the 2019 U-17 South American Championship. One of its top players at the event was Gui Carvalho.

Head coach position
  Pablo Costa – 2013

See also
Brazil national basketball team
Brazil women's national basketball team
Brazil national under-19 basketball team
Brazil national 3x3 team

References

External links
Official website
FIBA Profile
Latinbasket – Brazil Men National Team U16/17
Archived records of Brazil team participations

Men's national under-17 basketball teams
Basketball teams in Brazil
National youth sports teams of Brazil